The 1929 Marshall Thundering Herd football team was an American football team that represented Marshall College (now Marshall University) in the West Virginia Athletic Conference during the 1929 college football season. The team compiled a 5–3–1 record, 4–1 against conference opponents, and outscored opponents by a total of 184 to 79.

Former Michigan star John Maulbetsch was hired as Marshall's head football coach prior to the 1929 season. He was supported by two assistant coaches, Tom Dandelet and Johnny Stuart. Tom Stark was the team captain.

Schedule

References

Marshall
Marshall Thundering Herd football seasons
Marshall Thundering Herd football